Two ships of the British Royal Navy have been named HMS Oryx:

 , an auxiliary minesweeper, formerly the Norwegian whaler Hval I, hired from 1940 and renamed in 1941; she became HMS Gemsbuck in 1944 and was returned to Norway the following year.

References

Royal Navy ship names